The Forum of Irish Postgraduate Medical Training Bodies is a medical education body in Ireland. It was established in December 2006 with the stated aim of coordinating the activities of the postgraduate medical colleges of Ireland and their faculties, in order to improve standards of medical education and training.

As of 2014, the forum comprised the following colleges, faculties and committees:
College of Anaesthetists of Ireland
College of Psychiatrists of Ireland
Irish College of General Practitioners
Irish College of Ophthalmologists
Royal College of Physicians of Ireland
Faculty of Occupational Medicine
Faculty of Paediatrics
Faculty of Pathology
Faculty of Public Health Medicine
Institute of Medicine
Institute of Obstetricians & Gynaecologists
Faculty of Sports and Exercise Medicine (joint with RCSI)
Royal College of Surgeons in Ireland
Faculty of Dentistry
Faculty of Sports and Exercise Medicine (joint with RCPI)
Irish Committee for Emergency Medicine Training
Irish Surgical Postgraduate Training Committee

See also
 Academy of Medical Royal Colleges

References

Educational institutions established in 1974
Medical associations based in Ireland
Organisations based in Dublin (city)
2006 establishments in Ireland